Ceragenia insulana is a species of beetle in the family Cerambycidae. It was described by Fisher in 1943.

References

Trachyderini
Beetles described in 1943